The Sheltering Sky is a 1949 novel of alienation and existential despair by American writer and composer Paul Bowles.

Plot
The story centers on Port Moresby and his wife Kit, a married couple originally from New York who travel to the North African desert accompanied by their friend Tunner. The journey, initially an attempt by Port and Kit to resolve their marital difficulties, is quickly fraught by the travelers' ignorance of the dangers that surround them.

Reception
Time magazine included the novel in its TIME 100 Best English-language Novels from 1923 to 2005. The Modern Library also included it on their 100 best of the century, ranked at number 97.

Dramatic adaptations
The novel was adapted by Bernardo Bertolucci into a 1990 film with the same title starring Debra Winger and John Malkovich, and with a screenplay by Mark Peploe. The movie was filmed in Morocco, Algeria, and Niger and features powerful landscapes.

Cultural impact

Music 
The 1981 album Discipline by King Crimson includes an eight-minute instrumental composition titled "The Sheltering Sky". "Sheltering sky" is also referenced in the lyrics of the song "Walking on Air" from their 1995 album THRAK.
The 1983 album Synchronicity by the Police includes a song called "Tea in the Sahara", the lyrics of which contain the phrase "beneath the sheltering sky" and are based on the tragic story of the three dancers who wish to have tea in the desert, but end up dead from the heat, with their cups filled only with sand. The story is told to the character Port in Chapter 5.
The 1992 album Beyond the Sky by Omar Faruk Tekbilek was inspired by the film version of The Sheltering Sky.
The 1992 album Woman to Woman by Fem 2 Fem has a reference to this book in the song "Obsession".
The song "Lost" by Neurosis on the album Enemy of the Sun opens with a sample from the film. Also their album The Eye of Every Storm has a tracks entitled "Shelter" and " A Season in the Sky".
The God Machine's first album Scenes from the Second Storey opens with a similar sample.
The song "İki Yabancı" by Teoman on the album On Yedi makes a lyrical reference to the Turkish title of the movie.
The 2001 album Hypothetical by Threshold has a song titled "Sheltering Sky."
The song "fullmoon" from Ryuichi Sakamoto's 2017 album async contains excerpts of the novel presented in several languages.

Memorial 
In a 1993 interview just prior to his accidental on-set death, actor Brandon Lee quoted a passage from The Sheltering Sky. Lee had chosen this quote to be included in his upcoming wedding invitations; it is now inscribed on his tombstone:

References

External links

The authorized Paul Bowles website.
Review by Tennessee Williams

1949 American novels
Novels set in Algeria
Novels by Paul Bowles
Existentialist novels
American novels adapted into films